West Kirby is a coastal town in the Metropolitan Borough of Wirral in Merseyside, England. The town lies close to the mouth of the River Dee. 

Located within the boundaries of the historic county of Cheshire. At the 2011 Census, the population was 12,733. The town is on the opposite side of the River Dee to Mostyn in North Wales.

History 
The name West Kirby is of Viking origin, originally Kirkjubyr, meaning 'village with a church'. The form with the modifier "West" exists to distinguish it from the other town of the same name in Wirral: Kirkby-in-Walea (now the modern town of Wallasey). The earliest usage given of this form is West Kyrkeby in Wirhale in 1285.

The old village lay around St. Bridget's Church, but the town today is centred on West Kirby railway station, which is about 1 km away. The town has a Victorian promenade, flanked by the West Kirby Marine Lake that permits boats to sail even at low tide. The original wall was built to create the lake in 1899 but suffered a catastrophic leak in 1985. A new lake was constructed on the site which is wider than previously and allows better sporting opportunities. The Hoylake and West Kirby War Memorial is a notable local landmark, designed in 1922 by the British sculptor Charles Sargeant Jagger, who was responsible for a number of war memorials around the world, including the Royal Artillery Memorial at Hyde Park Corner in London.

Civic history 
West Kirby was a township and parish within the Wirral Hundred. It became part of Hoylake West Kirby civil parish
and Hoylake Urban District in 1894. The population was 148 in 1801, 435 in 1851 and 4,542 in 1901.

On 1 April 1974, West Kirby was absorbed into the newly created Metropolitan Borough of Wirral as part of local government reorganisation in England and Wales. At that point, West Kirby ceased to be in Cheshire for administrative purposes and became part of the new administrative county of Merseyside.

In February 2008 plans were raised for a regeneration of the concourse sports and leisure centre including new retail space and controversially a multi-storey car park. As of 2013 the project appears to have stalled with developers' interest and funding wavering. Local residents' opposition is strong.

Geography 
West Kirby lies at the north-western corner of the Wirral Peninsula.

Community

Schools 
Secondary schools in the area are Calday Grange Grammar School on Caldy Hill, West Kirby Grammar School and Hilbre High School, which includes the WestWirralWorks City Learning Centre and West Kirby Residential School.

Churches 

St Bridget's Church is West Kirby's Church of England parish church, and the chancel of the present church dates from around 1320. St Andrew's Church is West Kirby's second Church of England church, originally built as a chapel of ease for St Bridget's, gaining its own parish in 1920.

St Agnes' Church is the local Roman Catholic church. West Kirby also has a United Reformed church, which dates to 1890, and a Methodist church dating from 1904.

Leisure 
West Kirby Library is within West Kirby Concourse, and operated by the Metropolitan Borough of Wirral. The West Kirby Museum, founded in 1892, is adjacent to St Bridget's Church.

Parks, gardens and beach 

The town itself contains Ashton Park and a starting point of the Wirral Way, which follows the trackbed of the former Birkenhead Railway branch line from Hooton. Sandlea Park lies in the centre of the town, a short walk from the railway station. Coronation Gardens is located between the southern end of the promenade between South Parade and Banks Road. There are various other small parks and bowling greens around the town. Another popular activity is to walk out to the islands of Little Eye, Middle Eye and Hilbre Island at low tide. The promenade, beach and the walk to the war memorial allow an excellent panoramic view of part of the North Wales coastline.

Sport 

Sailboarding, sailing and kayaking are all popular local sports. In October 1991 the World Windsurfing Production Speed Record was set by Dave White on the West Kirby Marine Lake at 42.16 knots.

Water sports fans are warned to wear appropriate footwear while using the marine lake because of the presence of weaver fish with sharp poisonous barbs. There is also an RNLI Lifeboat Station near West Kirby Sailing Club.

The Royal Liverpool Golf Club, a links course between West Kirby and Hoylake, has hosted 11 British Open Golf championships in the past 121 years, most recently the 2006 and 2014 British Opens.

Tennis tournaments have been held in Ashton Park. Here, players including John McEnroe, Boris Becker, Monica Seles and Pete Sampras have played in competition.

West Kirby FC is the town's senior football club, which plays in the West Cheshire League and plays its matches at Marine Park, Greenbank Road. West Kirby Ladies FC was officially established in 2017 and also play their matches at Marine Park, as do West Kirby Ladies U18s who play in the Cheshire Women's and Youth League. The town has one of the largest junior football clubs in the North West, with over 90 teams and 1,000 players at West Kirby United. The teams play at many venues across West Kirby, including Calday Grange Grammar School, Hilbre High School and Greenbank Road. There were initially two junior clubs in the town, West Kirby Panthers and West Kirby Wasps, until the two sections merged to create West Kirby United in July 2017. The junior clubs play in the Eastham League with a youth section who play as West Kirby United in the North West under-21 League.

West Kirby is also home to Hoylake Amateur Swimming Club who train at West Kirby Concourse.

Marine Lake 
West Kirby has a large man-made coastal lake, the 'Marine Lake'. The structure is large enough to hold sailing events, such as the Wilson Trophy, sailboarding and many more water-related activities including canoeing, kayaking and power-boating. In early 2009 it was reported that the lake had undergone structural damage, most likely due to estuarine erosion. Since this report a £750K refurbishment has taken place to help restore the lake, and it is now back to holding water-sport activities.

Transport

Road 
Grange Road, the main thoroughfare of West Kirby, is part of the A540 road. The B5141, starting at the Dee Lane junction with Grange Road, joins West Kirby with Caldy via Banks Road, Sandy Lane and Caldy Road.

Bus 
The town is well served by buses with frequent connections to Birkenhead, and on to Liverpool, provided by Arriva North West services 407 and 437 which runs up to every 10–20 minutes. Stagecoach Merseyside also serve the town with connections along the coast on service 38. There is also a direct bus service 22 between West Kirby to Chester via Heswall and Neston that runs Hourly from Monday to Saturday.

Rail 
West Kirby railway station is the western terminus of Merseyrail's Wirral line, with return services to Birkenhead and Liverpool via Bidston which also provides a connection to Wrexham and North Wales.

Notable people 
Andrew Baddeley, English middle distance runner (1500 m), brought up in West Kirby and attended Calday Grange Grammar School.
Rafa Benitez, former Everton F.C. and Liverpool F.C. manager, lives in West Kirby.
Paul Clark, co-artistic director of performance company Clod Ensemble, was born in West Kirby.
Daniel Craig, James Bond actor, attended Hilbre High School and Calday Grange Grammar School in West Kirby.
Cyril Edward Gourley, recipient of the Victoria Cross, was a pupil at Calday Grange Grammar School and is buried in Grange Cemetery.
Esther McVey, British Conservative politician
Shirley Hughes, writer and illustrator, was brought up in West Kirby.
Pete Price, broadcaster, comedian and author is a presenter on Radio City.
Glenda Jackson, actress and politician, attended West Kirby Grammar School.
Selwyn Lloyd, former Chancellor of the Exchequer, Foreign Secretary and Speaker of the House of Commons, lived in West Kirby.
George Mallory, mountaineer, was schooled in West Kirby.
Denys Rayner, recipient of the Distinguished Service Cross, was brought up in West Kirby.
Bill Ryder-Jones,  co-founded The Coral in West Kirby.
Joanna Scanlan, actress and television writer, born in the town
David Sheppard, cricketer and Bishop of Liverpool, retired to West Kirby.
Philip Sheppard and Sir Cyril Clarke, lepidopterists, worked in West Kirby.
Olaf Stapledon, science fiction author and philosopher, is a former resident.

See also 

Listed buildings in Hoylake
Kirby Park railway station

References

Further reading

External links 

West Kirby 1841
West Kirby Museum
West Kirby Times

Towns and villages in the Metropolitan Borough of Wirral
Populated coastal places in Merseyside
Beaches of Merseyside